ISW Hoogeland is a high school in Naaldwijk, Westland, Netherlands.

References 

Secondary schools in the Netherlands